Aenetus eximia is a moth of the family Hepialidae. It is known from southern Queensland, Australia, to Tasmania.

The wingspan is about 70 mm. Adult males are blue-green. Females are green with two spots on each forewing. The hindwings are orange with green borders.

The larvae feed on a wide range of plants, including Syzygium smithii, Eucalyptus grandis, Waterhousea floribunda, Tristaniopsis, Doryphora sassafrass, Daphnandra micrantha, Glochidion ferdinandi, Nothofagus moorei, Prostanthera lasianthos, Dodonaea viscosa, Diploglottis australis, Pomaderris aspera, Dendrocnide excelsa, Lantana camara and Olearia argophylla. They live in tunnels and dig down into the trunk and root of their host plant. Pupation takes place inside the tunnel.

References

See also
Aenetus ligniveren

Moths described in 1869
Hepialidae